Richard Ureña Castillo (born February 26, 1996) is a Dominican professional baseball shortstop for the York Revolution of the Atlantic League of Professional Baseball. He has played in Major League Baseball (MLB) for the Toronto Blue Jays.

Professional career

Toronto Blue Jays
Ureña was signed as an international free agent by the Blue Jays for $725,000 in 2012, and played his first professional season split between the Dominican Summer League Blue Jays and Gulf Coast League Blue Jays. In 64 games with the DSL Blue Jays, he batted .296 with one home run and 35 runs batted in (RBI). He then played seven games in the Gulf Coast League, batting .333 with three RBI. Ureña was promoted to the Rookie Advanced Bluefield Blue Jays of the Appalachian League for the start of the 2014 season, and recorded a 28-game streak of reaching base safely. In 53 games, he hit .318 with two home runs and 20 RBI before he was promoted to the Short Season-A Vancouver Canadians on August 21. Ureña appeared in nine games for Vancouver, batting .242 with five RBI. On September 24, Ureña was named the Most Valuable Player for Bluefield in 2014. He began the 2015 season with the Class-A Lansing Lugnuts. On June 5, Ureña was named a Midwest League midseason All-Star. At that time, he led the Lugnuts with seven home runs, and had 35 RBI. Ureña was called up to the Advanced-A Dunedin Blue Jays in early July, and played 30 games there before returning to Lansing. In 121 games played, he batted .262 with 16 home runs and 66 RBI. In the offseason, he appeared in 33 games with the Gigantes del Cibao of the Dominican Winter League. Batting against pitchers that were over seven years of age older than him on average, Ureña hit .258 with five RBI.

Ureña was invited to Major League spring training on January 12, 2016, and reassigned to minor league camp on March 12. He was assigned to the Dunedin Blue Jays to open the 2016 minor league season. Ureña recorded his first career five-hit game on July 9 which gave him 91 hits on the season, raising his batting average to .292 and tying him with Scott Kingery for first place in the Florida State League. On July 27, Ureña was ranked 91st on MLB's Top 100 Prospects list, and was named the Blue Jays top prospect. He was promoted to the Double-A New Hampshire Fisher Cats on August 3, and had three hits in his debut that day. On August 10, Ureña hit three triples against the Bowie Baysox, which set a Fisher Cats single-game record. In 127 games in 2016, he hit .295 with eight home runs and 59 RBI. The Blue Jays added him to their 40-man roster after the season. Ureña spent the entire 2017 minor league season with Double-A New Hampshire, and hit .247 with five home runs and 60 RBI in a career-high 129 games played. 

Following his September callup to the Blue Jays in the previous season, Ureña was assigned to the Triple-A Buffalo Bisons to start the 2018 season. However, due to an intercostal strain which included a rehab assignment with the Dunedin Blue Jays, he did not join the Bisons until May 2.

Major Leagues
On August 31, 2017, Blue Jays' manager John Gibbons announced that Ureña would be called up on September 1. Ureña hit his first MLB home run on September 8, in Toronto's 5–4 loss to the Detroit Tigers. On September 12 he walked off the Baltimore Orioles, hitting an RBI single off closer Zach Britton to give the Blue Jays a 3–2 victory. On December 30, 2019, Ureña was designated for assignment.

Baltimore Orioles
On January 10, 2020, Ureña was claimed off waivers by the Baltimore Orioles. Ureña was designated for assignment on February 19, 2020. He became a free agent on November 2, 2020.

Toronto Blue Jays (Second Stint)
On December 18, 2020, Ureña signed a minor league contract with the Toronto Blue Jays organization.

Washington Nationals
On November 28, 2021, Ureña signed a minor league contract with the Washington Nationals. He was assigned to the Triple-A Rochester Red Wings to begin the 2022 season. After appearing in 37 games and hitting .231/.268/.321 with 2 home runs and 21 RBI, Ureńa was released on August 9, 2022.

York Revolution
On March 7, 2023, Ureña signed with the York Revolution of the Atlantic League of Professional Baseball.

References

External links

1996 births
Bluefield Blue Jays players
Buffalo Bisons (minor league) players
Dominican Republic expatriate baseball players in Canada
Dominican Republic expatriate baseball players in the United States
Dominican Summer League Blue Jays players
Dunedin Blue Jays players
Gigantes del Cibao players
Gulf Coast Blue Jays players
Lansing Lugnuts players

Living people
Major League Baseball players from the Dominican Republic
Major League Baseball shortstops
New Hampshire Fisher Cats players
People from San Francisco de Macorís
Toronto Blue Jays players
Vancouver Canadians players